The Nambucca and Bellinger News was a weekly English language newspaper published in Bowraville in the Nambucca Shire of New South Wales, Australia from 1911-1945. It was also published as Nambucca News: Bellingen Chronicle, The Nambucca District News, The Nambucca Guardian News, Guardian Gazette and The Nambucca Valley Guardian News.

Newspaper history 
The Nambucca and Bellinger News was published from 1911–1945. Prior to this it was known as the Nambucca News. It was continued by The Nambucca District News (1945-1966), now published in Macksville in the Nambucca Shire, then later merged with The Nambucca Guardian News and the Guardian Gazette (1958-1966) to form The Nambucca Valley Guardian News (1992-1997).

Digitisation 
The Nambucca and Bellinger News has been digitised as part of the Australian Newspapers Digitisation Program of the National Library of Australia.

See also 
 List of newspapers in Australia
 List of newspapers in New South Wales

External links

References 

Defunct newspapers published in New South Wales
Mid North Coast
Newspapers established in 1911
Publications disestablished in 1945
Weekly newspapers published in Australia